Lake Bridgeport, also known as Bridgeport Lake, is a man-made, freshwater reservoir located in Wise and Jack Counties in North Texas. The lake was created by damming the West Fork of the Trinity River and sits upstream from Eagle Mountain Lake.  The lake is owned by the Tarrant Regional Water District and the water impounded is used for flood control, residential and commercial sales, irrigation, and recreation.

History 
Lake Bridgeport has its origins as Bridgeport Reservoir, a component of the Trinity River canalization plan to prevent flooding along the West Fork of the Trinity River.  Construction of the lake's dam began in 1929 and was completed in 1931.  The estimated cost to complete the project was $2 million.

Recreation 
Lake Bridgeport is a popular freshwater fishing destination for anglers.  Largemouth Bass, Crappie, Hybrid Bass, and Sand Bass are some of the noted varieties of gamefish caught there.

Lake Bridgeport is also a popular recreational boating destination.  Boat ramps and marinas are located at various locations throughout the shore.

Wise County Park, (located on the northern end of the lake) provides camping and day use facilities.

See also 
 Tarrant Regional Water District
 Trinity River

References 
http://www.tpwd.state.tx.us/fishboat/fish/recreational/lakes/bridgeport/ accessed March 29, 2011
"LAKE BRIDGEPORT," Handbook of Texas Online (http://www.tshaonline.org/handbook/online/articles/rol18), accessed March 29, 2011. Published by the Texas State Historical Association.
"LAKE BRIDGEPORT INFORMATION," Tarrant Regional Water District Website (http://www.trwd.org/BridgeportMap.aspx), accessed March 29, 2011

External links 
 Tarrant Regional Water District information and map about Lake Bridgeport
 Texas Parks and Wildlife info about Lake Bridgeport

Bridgeport
Trinity River (Texas)
Bodies of water of Wise County, Texas
Bodies of water of Jack County, Texas
Protected areas of Wise County, Texas
Protected areas of Jack County, Texas